Lucie Voňková (28 February 1992) is a Czech former football striker, who was a member of the Czech Republic national team. As well as playing six seasons in her native country, she played for six seasons in Germany and two in the Netherlands.

Voňková was top scorer of the international indoor football  tournament Weltklasse 2013.

Voňková was voted footballer of the year at the 2016 and 2017 Czech Footballer of the Year (women).

Club career
Raised in FK Teplice, Voňková started her career in Slavia Prague, where she spent six years. In 2012, Voňková moved to Slavia's rival Sparta Prague. In her only season with Sparta, she won the domestic double and she made her UEFA Champions League debut. For the 2013-14 season she jumped to Germany's Frauen-Bundesliga, signing for MSV Duisburg. After two tough years in Duisburg, where she slowly adapted to higher quality of Bundesliga, Voňková moved to FF USV Jena and she started scoring goals more often. On 7 July 2017, Voňková signed for Bayern Munich. She joined Ajax in the Eredivisie in 2019. She announced her retirement in June 2021 at the age of 29, due to health reasons.

International career
Voňková made her debut for the national team in a friendly match against Poland on 31 May 2009. By the time of her retirement in June 2021, she was captain of the national team and had scored 22 goals in 72 matches for her country.

Career honours

Club
Sparta
Czech Women's First League (1): 2012–13
Czech Women's Cup (1): 2013

Individual
 Czech Footballer of the Year (women) (2): 2016, 2017

Personal life
In September 2018 Voňková married her partner Claudia van den Heiligenberg. In March 2021 Voňková announced van den Heiligenberg's pregnancy on social media.

Gallery

References

1992 births
Living people
Czech women's footballers
Czech Republic women's international footballers
People from Teplice
Expatriate women's footballers in Germany
Czech expatriate women's footballers
Czech expatriate sportspeople in Germany
FCR 2001 Duisburg players
MSV Duisburg (women) players
FF USV Jena players
SK Slavia Praha (women) players
AC Sparta Praha (women) players
Women's association football forwards
Frauen-Bundesliga players
FC Bayern Munich (women) players
Lesbian sportswomen
LGBT association football players
Czech LGBT sportspeople
Czechoslovak LGBT people
Czech lesbians
AFC Ajax (women) players
Czech expatriate sportspeople in the Netherlands
Expatriate women's footballers in the Netherlands
Czech Women's First League players
Sportspeople from the Ústí nad Labem Region